Pseudogarantiana is an extinct genus from a well-known class of fossil cephalopods, the ammonites. It lived during the Middle Jurassic.

Distribution
None cataloged

References

 Bajocien14

Jurassic ammonites